TV3 News @ 6 was the flagship evening news programme on the Irish television network TV3. It was produced by the TV3 News division.

The TV3 News @ 6, presented by main newscasters Alan Cantwell and Gráinne Seoige, was a sixty-minute news programme covering Irish national and international news stories, broadcast at 6:00pm from Monday to Friday.

At weekends the main evening bulletin also aired at 6:00pm but was reduced to thirty minutes.

History
TV3 News @ 6 was the first programme broadcast by TV3 on opening night on 20 September 1998.  The news programme provided a comprehensive view of the day's main international and national news stories and was in direct competition with RTÉ News: Six One.  This period of direct rivalry with RTÉ only lasted for a year as poor ratings, due to the strength of the competition from RTÉ, resulted in TV3 deciding to break up the hour-long programme.  Because of this two new programmes – First Edition at 5:30pm and TV3 News @ 7 – were launched.  Both programmes were still fronted by Cantwell and Seoige, while First Edition became Ireland's first early evening news programme.

Newscasters

Main newscaster

References

Irish television news shows
Virgin Media Television (Ireland) original programming